José Heriberto Sepúlveda Beltrán (born September 27, 1960), also known as El Monteaguilino is a Chilean folklorist and television host.

Biography 
José Sepúlveda was born on September 27, 1960, in Monte Águila, Chile. He is the son of María Beltrán Bobadilla and José Sepúlveda Padilla, and he has 7 brothers.

Artistic career 
He made his debut in 1988 at the Viña del Mar International Song Festival, where he performed the song "El Caballito de Metal", based on the Chilean railway industry and the peasant world. The song, which was a guaracha, was disqualified, because at that time the competition regulations required that the songs sung be typical of Chilean folklore, a requirement that the guaracha did not fulfill. However, the song he played became iconic and allowed him to continue in the field of folk music, of which he is still a part today.

Between 2012 and 2015, he was a television host on the program Revoliendo el Gallinero, on the UCV TV channel, which consisted of interviewing other singers around the country.

Even though he has been accused of writing a song dedicated to Lucía Hiriart, Augusto Pinochet's wife, he has denied it, claiming that "I like politics, but from afar."

In 2020, due to the COVID-19 pandemic, he has begun to record and broadcast his works digitally. He was also invited to the TV marathon Vamos Chilenos.

Discography

References

External links 

 El Monteaguilino's Official Site (in Spanish)
 El Monteaguilino on Facebook

20th-century Chilean male singers
People from Monte Águila
Chilean folklorists
Living people
1960 births
20th-century Chilean male artists